This is the complete list of Commonwealth Games medallists in triathlon from 2002 to 2022.

Medallists

Men's individual

Women's individual

Mixed relay

Men's PTVI

Women's PTVI

Men's PTWC

Women's PTWC

References
Results Database from the Commonwealth Games Federation

Triathlon
Medalists

Commonw